Tommy Bonnesen (27 March 1873 – 14 March 1935) was a Danish mathematician, known for Bonnesen's inequality.

Bonnesen studied at the University of Copenhagen, where in 1902 he received his Ph.D. (promotion) with thesis Analytiske studier over ikke-euklidisk geometri (Analytic studies of non-Euclidean geometry). He was the Professor for Descriptive Geometry at the Polytekniske Læreanstalt.

He did research on convex geometry and wrote a book on this subject with his student Werner Fenchel. Bonessen was an Invited Speaker at the ICM in 1924 in Toronto and in 1928 in Bologna.

With Harald Bohr he was for many years the co-editor-in-chief of the Matematisk Tidsskrift of the Danish Mathematical Society.

His younger daughter was the theatrical and cinematic star Beatrice Bonnesen (1906–1979). His elder daughter Merete Bonnesen (1901–1980) was a journalist employed by the newspaper Politiken.

Selected publications
 Analytiske Studier over ikke-euklidisk Geometri, Kopenhagen 1902
 with Werner Fenchel: Theorie der konvexen Körper, Springer 1934, English translation: Theory of convex bodies, Moscow (Idaho), BCS Associates 1987
 Les Problèmes des Isopérimètres et des Isépiphanes, Paris, Gauthier-Villars 1929
 Extréma liés, Kopenhagen 1931

Sources
 Klaus Voss: Integralgeometrie für Stereologie und Bildrekonstruktion, Springer 2007, p.161

References

1873 births
1935 deaths
Geometers
20th-century Danish mathematicians
University of Copenhagen alumni
Academic staff of the Technical University of Denmark